Shooting Bigfoot: America's Monster Hunters is a 2013 British documentary directed by Morgan Matthews. It follows Matthews as he travels to America to spend time with four amateur Bigfoot hunters.

Premise
Morgan Matthews explains that since he was a child he had an interest in Bigfoot. He travels to America and meets with Bigfoot hunters Dallas Gilbert and Wayne Burton in Ohio, Rick Dyre in Texas, and Tom Biscardi in California.

During the film Matthews goes on Bigfoot hunts with each hunter and discusses the history of hoaxing in the world of Bigfoot hunting.

Cast
Morgan Matthews
Tom Biscardi
Wayne Burton
Rick Dyer
Dallas Gilbert

Release
Shooting Bigfoot premiered at the Hot Docs film festival in Toronto and aired as part of the 2013 Edinburgh International Film Festival, and was released in April of the same year.

Reception
Drew Taylor from IndieWire gave Shooting Bigfoot an A−, calling it "riotously entertaining", and praising Matthews' dry approach.

References

External links

British documentary films
2013 documentary films
2013 films
Bigfoot films
Documentary films about the paranormal
2010s English-language films
2010s British films